Cumnock West was one of 32 electoral wards of East Ayrshire Council. Created in 1999, the ward elected one councillor using the first-past-the-post voting electoral system.

The ward was a Labour stronghold as the party successfully held the seat at every election. 

In 2007, the ward was abolished and replaced by the multi-member Cumnock and New Cumnock ward as council elections moved to a proportional voting system – the single transferable vote – following the implementation of the Local Governance (Scotland) Act 2004.

Boundaries
The Cumnock West ward was created in 1999 by the Third Statutory Reviews of Electoral Arrangements from parts of the Cumnock East, Cumnock South and Old Cumnock and Cumnock West and Auchinleck wards. The ward took in the western part of Cumnock including the neighbourhood of Holmhead. In 2007, the ward was abolished as the Local Governance (Scotland) Act 2004 saw proportional representation and new multi-member wards introduced. The area covered by the Cumnock West ward was placed into the new Cumnock and New Cumnock ward.

Councillors

Election results

2003 election

1999 election

References

Wards of East Ayrshire
Cumnock